Kul Prasad Nepal is a Nepalese politician, belonging to the Communist Party of Nepal (Unified Marxist-Leninist). In April 2008, he won the Palpa-3 seat in the Constituent Assembly election.

Elected to the Constituent Assembly from constituency no. 2 of Palpa, CA member Kul Prasad Nepal is a member of CPN-UMLs district committee. Fifty-seven-year-old Nepals political career began in 1967 when he joined Left politics. He spent three years in jail on the charges of involvement in anti-Panchayat activities. During the run-up to the democratic movement in 1989, he was the president of Bammorchas district committee for Palpa and since 1991 he has been a member of CPN-UMLs district committee. He is a graduate in Political Science. He says that partys agenda and his broad public relations accounts for his victory in the CA polls. Nepal, who had taken part in the 1991s parliamentary elections, is, besides politics, is interested in social service. He believes that the new constitution to be drafted through consensus and coordination of all the parties can sketch out the future of new Nepal. He says that institutionalization of democratic republican order ad inclusive representation of all in state affairs are the two agendas he wants to raise in the Constituent Assembly.

References

Living people
Communist Party of Nepal (Unified Marxist–Leninist) politicians
Year of birth missing (living people)
Members of the 1st Nepalese Constituent Assembly